Samuel McGregor (born 12 August 1984) is an Australian male former water polo player. He was part of the Australia men's national water polo team. He competed in the 2004 Summer Olympics, the 2008 Summer Olympics and the 2012 Summer Olympics. He also competed at the 2011 World Aquatics Championships and captained the Australian team at the London games.

References

External links
 

1984 births
Living people
Australian male water polo players
Olympic water polo players of Australia
Water polo players at the 2004 Summer Olympics
Water polo players at the 2008 Summer Olympics
Water polo players at the 2012 Summer Olympics
Sportspeople from Darwin, Northern Territory
Place of birth missing (living people)